ABG fast interceptor craft are a series of thirteen  high-speed interceptor boats designed and supplied in knocked down kits by Henderson based Global Marine Design (Headed by Gavin Mair) and assembled by ABG Shipyard, Surat for the Indian Coast Guard.

Design
They are wide aluminum-hulled, water jet-propelled vessels for operations in close coastal and shallow waters. The ABG fast interceptors are fitted with a 12.7 mm "Prahari" Heavy Machine Gun (HMG). They have a crew of eleven enrolled personnel, with one officer and ten sailors.

History
Initially two units were ordered by the Indian Coast Guard for evaluation during 1999–2000 at a cost of Rs 26.5 crore. The first unit (C-141) was launched in October 2000 and was delivered in 2001. The second unit (C-142) was delivered on 8 February 2002. They were commissioned at Porbandar and were extensively tested by the Coast Guard for ascertaining their speed and design specifications. The boats achieved the desired speed during trials. Thereafter a follow-on order was placed on 30 March 2006 for 11 boats. The cost price of each unit in the follow-on order was Rs 17.63 crore, aggregating to Rs 193.94 crore for the whole order.

Ships

See also
 Solas Marine Fast Interceptor Boat
 L&T-class fast interceptor craft
 Couach fast interceptor boats
 Cochin Fast Patrol Vessels
 Alcock Ashdown Survey Catamaran
 Rajshree-class patrol vessel
 Rani Abbakka-class patrol vessel
 GSL-class offshore patrol vessel

References

External links
 Marine Kits catalogue
 Capital Market
 Aviation Week

Fast attack craft of the Indian Coast Guard
Patrol boat classes
Auxiliary search and rescue ship classes
Ships of the Indian Coast Guard
Military boats